Jack Hallam may refer to:

 Jack Hallam (footballer) (1869–1949), footballer for Wales
 Jack Hallam (politician) (born 1942), Australian politician

See also
 John Hallam (1941–2006), Northern Irish actor
 John Hallam (priest) (died 1811), Canon of Windsor